Ayumi Hamasaki Power of Music 2011 A is Japanese pop singer Ayumi Hamasaki's 13th Tour. Tour started on May 7, 2011, at Hiroshima Green Arena, continued as 'FINAL Chapter' started on September 30, 2011, at Osaka Castle Hall and ending as "Limited Edition" on October 18 and 19, 2011 at Saitama Super Arena. DVD released on March 21, 2012.

Track listing
From Oricon
 snowfield
 forgiveness
 progress
 M
 decision
 Catcher in the Light
 walking proud
 part of Me
 beloved
 BRILLANTE
 overture
 Days
 ANother song feat. URATA NAOYA
 Why... feat. JUNO
 vogue ~ Far away ~ SEASONS
 WONDERLAND
 Bold & Delicious
 Mirrorcle World
 evolution
 Boys & Girls
 Born to Be...
 A Song Is born
 Thank U
 Making Movie

Total reported sales
21,365

Oricon chart positions
1st week = #6

References

Ayumi Hamasaki video albums
Live video albums
2012 video albums